Rawsonia lucida (synonym R. reticulata) is a species of plant in the Achariaceae family. It is found in eastern, central and southern Africa.

References

External links

lucida
Least concern plants
Taxonomy articles created by Polbot